is a Japanese voice actress affiliated with Aoni Production. She is also credited as Mami.

Voice roles
 Dr Slump - Akane Kimidori
 Dragon Fist - Naoki Koga (young)
 Hanasaka Tenshi Ten-Ten-kun - Hideyuki Sakura
 Marmalade Boy - Eddy
 Mobile Fighter G Gundam - Chibodee Crocket (young)
 Mobile Suit Gundam SEED - Nicol Amalfi
 Nintama Rantarou - Shouzaemon
 One Piece - Hoichael
 Project ARMS - Oscar Brenton
 Sailor Moon S - U-Pasokon
 Sailor Moon SuperS - KeroKero, Ponko
 Ushio and Tora - Masako Nakamura

External links
 Aoni profile
 

1962 births
Japanese voice actresses
Aoni Production voice actors
Living people